Brooks Headley is an American musician and chef, best known as the drummer in several hardcore punk and indie rock bands.

Headley was the executive pastry chef at Del Posto, a New York Times-rated four-star restaurant, in New York City. He left Del Posto to open a vegetarian burger bar, Superiority Burger.

Musical career
Headley played drums in the Baltimore-area hardcore/emo band Universal Order of Armageddon from 1992 to 1994.  With Universal Order of Armageddon bandmate Tonie Joy, he also joined the final lineup of the political hardcore band Born Against in 1993.

Later that year, he moved to Richmond, Virginia, and co-founded the group (Young) Pioneers, with whom he remained for several years.  Through the remainder of the 1990s, he had brief stints in Men's Recovery Project and The Great Unraveling, followed by more extended time in Skull Kontrol and Wrangler Brutes.

Headley has formed the band Oldest with guitarist Mick Barr of Orthrelm.  Additionally, he is active with Universal Order of Armageddon, who again began performing in 2010.

Personal information
In 1999, Headley earned a bachelor's degree from the University of Maryland, where he was a member of the Golden Key National Honor Society.

In May 2013, Headley won the prestigious "Outstanding Pastry Chef" from the James Beard Foundation for his work at the New York restaurant, Del Posto. In 2019, Headley was nominated for the James Beard Foundation Award "Best Chef: New York City" for Superiority Burger.

References

External links
Brooks Headley at The Chef and Restaurant Database
Oldest at MySpace.com

American punk rock musicians
Living people
Place of birth missing (living people)
University of Maryland, College Park alumni
Musicians from New York City
American chefs
Men's Recovery Project members
Born Against members
(Young) Pioneers members
Year of birth missing (living people)